Catherine Diane Caldwell Eagles (born August 30, 1958) is a United States district judge of the United States District Court for the Middle District of North Carolina and a former Superior Court judge in Guilford County, North Carolina. She is the first female judge to serve in the Middle District.

Early life and education
Eagles was born Catherine Diane Caldwell in Memphis, Tennessee in 1958. She graduated from Rhodes College (then called Southwestern at Memphis) in 1979 with a Bachelor of Arts degree. In 1982, she earned a Juris Doctor from George Washington University Law School.

Legal career
After law school, Eagles served as a staff law clerk for the United States Court of Appeals for the Eighth Circuit and as a clerk to Judge J. Smith Henley. After her clerkship, Eagles worked from 1984 to 1993 as an associate and partner at Smith, Helms, Mullis & Moore in Greensboro, North Carolina. In 1993 she was appointed to a seat as a resident superior court judge based in Greensboro. She was elected to serve the remainder of the term in 1994 and re-elected in 1996 and 2004 to eight-year terms. In 2006 she became the senior resident superior court judge in Guilford County.

Federal judicial service
On March 10, 2010, President Barack Obama nominated Eagles to a seat in the Middle District of North Carolina that came open when N. Carlton Tilley assumed senior status. Eagles had a hearing in front of the Senate Judiciary Committee on April 16, 2010, and her nomination was reported to the full Senate on May 6, 2010. The Senate approved her nomination on December 16, 2010, during the lame duck session of the 111th Congress. She received her commission on December 22, 2010.

Notable cases

In 2012, she presided over U.S. v. Johnny Reid Edwards, where former presidential candidate and senator John Edwards was charged with campaign finance violations.

See also
List of first women lawyers and judges in North Carolina

References

External links

1958 births
Living people
Rhodes College alumni
George Washington University Law School alumni
North Carolina state court judges
Judges of the United States District Court for the Middle District of North Carolina
United States district court judges appointed by Barack Obama
21st-century American judges
People from Memphis, Tennessee
21st-century American women judges